Huancayo may refer to:
 Huancayo, a city in Peru.
 Huancayo District, a district in the Huancayo province.
 Huancayo Province, a province in the Junín region.
 Huancayo Airport, an airport in Huancayo.